The Conflict of Adam and Eve with Satan (also known as The Book of Adam and Eve) is a 6th-century Christian extracanonical work found in Ge'ez, translated from an Arabic original.

It does not form part of the canon of any church.

Editions and translations
It was first translated from the Ge'ez Ethiopic version into German by August Dillmann.  It was first translated into English by S. C. Malan from the German of Ernest Trumpp. The first half of Malan's translation is included as the "First Book of Adam and Eve" and the "Second Book of Adam and Eve" in The Lost Books of the Bible and the Forgotten Books of Eden. The books mentioned below were added by Malan to his English translation; the Ethiopic is divided into sections of varying length, each dealing with a different subject.

Content
Books 1 and 2 begin immediately after the expulsion from the Garden of Eden, and end with the testament and translation of Enoch. Great emphasis is placed in Book 1 on Adam's sorrow and helplessness in the world outside the garden.

In Book 1, the punished Serpent attempts to kill Adam and Eve, but is prevented by God, who again punishes the Serpent by rendering it mute and casting it to India. Satan also attempts to deceive and kill Adam and Eve several times. In one of his attempts on their life, he throws a boulder which ends up encompassing Adam and Eve. God eventually saves them and compares this event with the upcoming Resurrection of Christ. God also predicts several other future Biblical events, including Noah and the flood.

This Genun, as the inventor of musical instruments, seems to correspond to the Biblical Jubal; however he also invents weapons of war. The Cainites, descended from Cain the first murderer, are described as exceedingly wicked, being prone to commit murder and incest. After seducing the Sethites, their offspring become the Nephilim, the "mighty men" of Gen. 6 who are all destroyed in the deluge, as also detailed in other works such as I Enoch and Jubilees.

Books 3 and 4 continue with the lives of Noah, Shem, Melchizedek, etc. through to the destruction of Jerusalem by Titus in AD 70. The genealogy from Adam to Jesus is given, as in the Gospels, but including also the names of the wives of each of Jesus' ancestors, which is extremely rare.

Textual origin
The Cave of Treasures is a Syriac work containing many of the same legends; indeed, as Malan remarks, a whole body of stories expanding upon the Old Testament is found in the Talmud, in the Koran, and in other late antique texts.

Contradiction with the Bible
 1st Adam and Eve LXXVIII:16  says "Then on the morrow Adam said unto Cain his son, 'Take of thy sheep, young and good, and offer them up unto thy God; and I will speak to thy brother, to make unto his God an offering of corn.'" while  says "And in process of time it came to pass, that Cain brought of the fruit of the ground an offering unto the LORD.  And Abel, he also brought of the firstlings of his flock and of the fat thereof. And the LORD had respect unto Abel and to his offering:".
 Book 2 has discrepancies with Old Testament saint lifetimes:  
 Enos lived 985 years (2nd Adam and Eve XIV:4) whereas the Bible says that he lived 905 years.
 Mahalaleel lived 870 years (2nd Adam and Eve XVI:2) whereas the Bible says that he lived 895 years.  
 Jared lived 989 years (2nd Adam and Eve XXI:13) whereas the Bible says that he lived 962 years.

See also 
Life of Adam and Eve
Apocalypse of Adam
Testament of Adam
Books of Adam

References

External links 
The First Book of Adam and Eve and the Second Book of Adam and Eve, Malan's translation as modernized by Dennis Hawkins:

 From Project Gutenberg: First Book
 From Blackmask: First Book and Second Book
 From Dubjockey: First Book  and Second Book 
 From Internet Archive: Complete translation, including Books 3 and 4
 From Live Search Books
 

6th-century Christian texts
Old Testament apocrypha

Texts in Ge'ez
Satan
Old Testament apocrypha related with Adam and Eve